Copernicia brittonorum is a palm which is endemic to western and west central Cuba.

References

brittonorum
Trees of Cuba
Vulnerable plants